List of the commanders and leaders of the Nizari–Seljuk conflicts

Participants

The conflicts were more complex than a simple Nizari vs Seljuk one. Even the Ismailis themselves were not unified; e.g. the Ismailis in Isfahan did not recognize the authority of Hassan-i Sabbah in Alamut. Sometimes the actual anti-Ismailism came from the local Sunni population rather than the Seljuk government, such as the massacre of the Ismailis in Isfahan in 1101. In the Seljuk dynastic conflicts, all sides were relying on Ismaili soldiers, and some Seljuk elites are known to be Ismaili converts (e.g. Iranshah ibn Turanshah) or at least to have Nizari sympathies at times (e.g. Barkiyaruq and Ridwan ibn Tutush).

Nizari Ismailis

Unlike the Fatimids who mostly produced learned scholars, the Nizaris of Alamut were mostly preoccupied with survival in their extremely hostile environment, and naturally produced, or acquired the alliance of, good military leaders. Many of these commanders are both military leaders and religious preachers (da'i) at the same time.

 Abd al-Malik ibn Attash, Fatimid Chief Da'i of Persia and Iraq (1070s)
Hassan-i Sabbah, Da'i of Daylam
Tahir, local leader in Sawa
 Hassan-i Sabbah, hujja, Lord of Alamut (1090–1124)
Dihdar Abu Ali Ardestani, da'i in Qazwin
Husayn Qa'ini, da'i, muhtasham (Governor) of Quhistan
Kiya Muzaffar?, muhtasham of Quhistan
al-Hakim al-Munajjim, Chief Da'i of Syria
Abu Tahir al-Sa'igh, Chief Da'i of Syria
Abu al-Fath of Sarmin, da'i in Syria
Husam al-Din ibn Dumlaj, commander of the Nizari armed forces in Aleppo
Ibrahim al-Ajami, commandant of the Qal'at al-Balis
Isma'il, da'i
Unnamed brother of al-Hakim al-Munajjim
Bahram al-Da'i, Chief Da'i of Syria
Mu'ayyad al-Din Muzaffar ibn Ahmad Mustawfi, former Seljuk ra'is, commandant of Gerdkuh
Abu Hamza, da'i in Arrajan
Kiya Buzurg-Ummid, commander, commandant of Lambsar Castle
Kiya Abu Ja'far, commander
Kiya Abu Ali, commander
Kiya Garshasb, commander
Hasan Adam Qasrani
Kayqubad Daylami, commandant of Tikrit Citadel
 Ahmad ibn Abd al-Malik ibn Attash, da'i
 Kiya Buzurg-Ummid, hujja, Lord of Alamut (1124–1138)
Dihdar Abu Ali Ardestani, member of the ruling council
Hasan Adam Qasrani, member of the ruling council
Kiya Abu Ja'far, member of the ruling council
Isma'il al-Ajami, Chief Da'i of Syria
Salarjuy(?), defected Seljuk amir
Kiya Nushad(?), commander
Khwaja Muhammad Nasihi Shahrastani
 Kiya Muhammad ibn Buzurg-Ummid, hujja, Lord of Alamut (1138–1162)
Kiya Muhammad ibn Ali Khusraw Firuz, commander
Kiya Ali ibn Buzurg-Ummid, commander
Dihkhuda Abu Yusuf, commander
Kiya Husayn ibn Abd al-Jabbar
Amir Balqasim Shamshirzan, commander in Lambsar
Amir Malikshah, commander
Kiya Isma'il, commander
Ali ibn Wafa', commander in Syria
Shaykh Abu Muhammad, Chief Da'i of Syria

 Hassan II 'Ala Dhikrihi's-Salam, Imam, Lord of Alamut (1162–1166)
Rashid al-Din Sinan, Chief Da'i of Syria
 Nur al-Din Muhammad II, Imam, Lord of Alamut (1166–1210)

Allies and sympathizers
  Barkiyaruq (occasionally), sultan
 Majd al-Mulk al-Balasani, vizier of Barkiyaruq
  Amirdad Habashi, amir of Barkiyaruq, commander of Tabaristan and Jurjan
 Mu'ayyad al-Din Muzaffar ibn Ahmad Mustawfi, Seljuk ra'is
 Sa'd al-Mulk, vizier of Muhammad Tapar
 Abu al-Qasim Dargazini, vizier of Mahmud II
 Iranshah ibn Turanshah, sultan of the Seljuks of Kirman
  Sanjar, ruler of Khurasan (1097–1118), sultan of the Great Seljuk Empire (1118–1153)
 Fakhr al-Mulk Ridwan ibn Tutush, sultan of Aleppo
 Shams al-Mulk Alp Arslan al-Akhras (until 1113), sultan of Aleppo
Ilghazi, amir, Artuqid prince of Mardin and Mayyafariqin
Toghtekin, atabeg of Damascus
Abu Ali Tahir ibn Sa'd al-Mazadaqani, vizier
Shahrnush ibn Hazarasf ibn Namawar, Bawandid ruler
Hazarasf ibn Shahrnush (d. 1190), Paduspanid ruler
 Raymond of Poitiers, Prince of Antioch
 Al-Amid ibn Mansur (Mas'ud?), governor of Turaythith
Many others*

Nizari enemies

Great Seljuk Empire

 Malikshah I, sultan of the Great Seljuk Empire (1072–1092)
Nizam al-Mulk, vizier, atabeg of Malikshah I, de facto ruler (1072–1092)
 Abu Muslim, prefect of Rayy
 Yurun-Tash, amir of Rudbar
 Arslan-Tash, amir
 Qizil-Sarigh, amir
 Barkiyaruq, sultan of the Great Seljuk Empire (1094–1105)
Abd al-Rahman al-Simirumi, vizier
Abd al-Jalil Abu al-Fath Durdanah al-Dihistani, vizier
Fakhr al-Mulk ibn Nizam al-Mulk, vizier
 Sanjar, ruler of Khurasan (1097–1118)
Bursuq the Elder, amir ispahsalar, governor of Luristan, atabeg of Sanjar, shihna of Khurasan
 Ahmad ibn Muhammad al-Labbad, governor of Isfahan
 Abu Muslim, ra'is (prefect) of Rayy
 Anushtagin, amir
 Unar Malikshahi, amir sipahdar
 Siyah(push?), amir
 Arghush al-Nizami, amir sipahdar, mamluk of Nizam al-Mulk
kjmš (کجمش), deputy of Arghush al-Nizami
 Sarzan Malikshahi, amir sipahsalar
 Sunqurcha, wali of Dihistan
 Sultan al-Ulama' Abu al-Qasim Asfazari, ra'is of Bayhaq
Abd al-Rahman Qazwini
Abu Muhammad Za'farani, Hanafi scholar, military leader
Iskandar Sufi Qazwini, mufti
Abdullah Isfahani, qadi
Muntahi Alawi, mufti of Jurjan

 Muhammad Tapar, sultan of the Great Seljuk Empire (1105–1118)
 Sanjar, ruler of Khurasan (1097–1118)
 Fakhr al-Dawla Chawli, atabeg of Fars
 Anushtagin Shirgir, atabeg, governor of Sawa
 Mawdud ibn Altuntash, amir ispahsalar, atabeg of Mosul, governor of Diyar Bakr and the Levant
 Aqsunqur al-Bursuqi, atabeg of Mosul
Ahmad ibn Nizam al-Mulk, vizier
 Ahmadil ibn Ibrahim al-Kurdi, amir of Maragha
 Balakabak Sarmuz, senior amir
Abu 'Amid, mustawfi (accountant) of Rayy
Abu al-Muzaffar al-Khujandi, chief preacher in Rayy, mufti
Abu Ja'far Mashshati Razi, mufti of Rayy
 Abu al-Hasan, ra'is of Bayhaq
Ubayd Allah ibn Ali al-Khatibi, qadi of Isfahan
Sa'id ibn Muhammad ibn Abd al-Rahman, qadi of Nishapur
Abu al-Ala', mufti in Isfahan

 Sanjar, nominal head of the Seljuq dynasty (1118–1153) (the Supreme Sultan; al-sultan al-a'zam)
Mu'in al-Mulk Abu Nasr ibn Fazl, vizier
Mu'in al-Din al-Kashi, vizier
Yamin al-Dawla Khwarazmshah, vizier, prince of the Khwarazmian dynasty
 Bazghash, amir
 Qajaq, amir
 Muhammad ibn Anaz, amir
 Ala al-Din Mahmud, governor of Turaythith
 Aqsunqur, mamluk, governor of Turshiz (killed while rebelling against the sultan)
?, qadi of Quhistan
 Tughrul Mahalli, wali of Damghan

 Mahmud II, sultan of the Seljuks of Iraq (1118–1131)
Kamal al-Mulk Abu Talib al-Simirumi, vizier
 Tamurtughan, amir
 Yaran-Qush Bazdar, amir of Qazwin
 Unar, amir of Khurasan
 Asil, commander
 Unnamed Turkic amir in Qazwin
 Unnamed sons of Yaran-Qush Bazdar
 Qimaz(?) Harami, commander
 Sunqur Inanj, wali of Rayy
Abu Nasr Muhammad ibn Nasr ibn Mansur al-Harawi, Hanafi qadi of Hamadan
Abd al-Latif al-Khujandi, Shafi'i leader in Isfahan
 Da'ud, sultan of the Seljuks of Iraq (1131–1132)
 Tughril II, sultan of the Seljuks of Iraq (1132–1135)
?, vizier
 Mas'ud, sultan of the Seljuks of Iraq (1135–1152)
 Abbas, amir, shihna (governor) of Rayy
Jawhar, chamberlain
 Dawlatshah Alawi, prefect of Isfahan
 Aqsunqur Ahmadili, atabeg of Maragha
 Shams Tabrizi, ra'is (prefect) of Tabriz
Hasan ibn Abi al-Qasim Karkhi, mufti of Qazwin
 Qutlugh, wali of Qazwin
 Aqsunqur Firuzkuhi, wali of Rayy
 Khumar-Tash, commander
Unnamed qadi of Tiflis
Unnamed qadi of Hamadan
 Muhammad II ibn Mahmud, sultan
 Balak Ghazi, amir, (nominal) governor of Aleppo
Ibn al-Khashshab, qadi and ra'is of Aleppo, de facto ruler of Aleppo since 1113
 Nur al-Din Mahmud, Zengid amir of Damascus and Aleppo
 Janah al-Dawla, amir of Homs
 Shams al-Mulk Alp Arslan al-Akhras (since 1113), sultan of Aleppo
Sa'id ibn Badi', ra'is of Aleppo and militia (al-ahdath) commander
Taj al-Muluk Buri, Burid atabeg of Damascus
Mufarrij ibn al-Hasan ibn al-Sufi, prefect of Damascus (ra'is al-shihna)
Yusuf ibn Firuz, military governor of Damascus (ra'is al-shurta)
Nasir al-Dawla ibn al-Muhalhil, vizier
 Garashasaf, wāli of Kirman

Abbasid Caliphate

 al-Mustazhir, caliph
 al-Mustarshid, caliph
 al-Rashid, caliph
 al-Mustadi, caliph
Adud al-Din Abu al-Faraj Muhmmad ibn Abdallah, vizier

Fatimid Caliphate

 al-Afdal Shahanshah, vizier
 al-Musta'li, Caliph-Imam
 al-Amir bi-Ahkam Allah, Caliph-Imam
 al-Ma'mun al-Bata'ihi, vizier
 Khalaf ibn Mula'ib, semi-independent amir of Homs and Apamea
 Mus'ab ibn Mula'ib, commander

Ayyubid Sultanate

 Saladin, sultan of Syria and Egypt

Crusaders

  Principality of Antioch
 Tancred, Regent of Antioch

  Kingdom of Jerusalem
 Baldwin II, King of Jerusalem
 Conrad I, King of Jerusalem (de facto)
 Amalric, King of Jerusalem
  County of Tripoli
 Raymond II, Count of Tripoli
Ralph of Merle, knight
Unnamed lieutenant
  Knights Templar
  Odo de St Amand, Grand Master (1171–1179)
 Du Mesnil, knight
  Knights Hospitaller
 Raymond du Puy, Grand Master
 Gilbert of Assailly, Grand Master
 Roger de Moulins, Grand Master
 Guérin de Montaigu, Grand Master

Other (semi)-independent leaders

 Mahdi, Zaydi commandant of Alamut Castle
Baha' al-Dawla of Sistan
Rasamuj, commandant of Lambsar Castle
Shah Ghazi Rustam, Bawandid ruler of Mazandaran and Gilan
Girdbazu, King of Mazandaran
Kayka'us, Paduspanid ruler (d. 1164/1165)
 Abu Hashim Alawi, Zaydi Imam
 Hadi Kiya ibn Abi Hashim, Zaydi Imam
Mahmashad, Karramiyya leader
Garshasaf, amir, ruler in Georgia

See also
List of Isma'ili missionaries
List of assassinations by the Assassins

References

Sources

 
Nizari-Seljuk
Nizari-Seljuk
Lists of 11th-century people
Lists of 12th-century people
Isma'ilism-related lists